See also John Stewart (ice hockey, born 1954)

John Alexander Stewart (born May 16, 1950) is a Canadian former professional ice hockey winger who played 257 games in the National Hockey League and 95 games in the World Hockey Association.

Early life 
Stewart was born in Eriksdale, Manitoba, and raised in Warren, Manitoba.

Career
Stewart was selected by the Pittsburgh Penguins in the second round (21st overall) of the 1970 NHL Amateur Draft. During his career, he played with the Pittsburgh Penguins, Atlanta Flames, California Golden Seals, Cleveland Crusaders, Birmingham Bulls, and Minnesota Fighting Saints. 

After retiring from hockey, John graduated from seminary in 1988 in Minneapolis, Minnesota. He served as a pastor for 18 years, planting two churches in Minnesota. He now serves as the executive director of Lamplighters International Inc., an evangelical Christian ministry he founded in 2000. He is the author 28 books and also speaks in conferences and churches, both nationally and internationally.

Regular season and playoffs

External links 

1950 births
Living people
Amarillo Wranglers players
Atlanta Flames players
Birmingham Bulls players
California Golden Seals players
Canadian ice hockey left wingers
Cleveland Crusaders players
Flin Flon Bombers players
Hershey Bears players
Ice hockey people from Manitoba
Minnesota Fighting Saints players
Nova Scotia Voyageurs players
Philadelphia Firebirds (AHL) players
Pittsburgh Penguins draft picks
Pittsburgh Penguins players
Winnipeg Jets (WHL) players